Kerry Mentore (born 19 September 1984) is an Antiguan cricketer. He played in one first-class and two Twenty20 matches for the Leeward Islands in 2010 and 2011.

See also
 List of Leeward Islands first-class cricketers

References

External links
 

1984 births
Living people
Antigua and Barbuda cricketers
Leeward Islands cricketers